The Naked Hours is a 1964 Italian drama film directed  by Marco Vicario and starring Keir Dullea and Rossana Podestà. It is based on the novel Appuntamento al mare by Alberto Moravia.

Plot

Cast 
 Keir Dullea as Aldo 
 Rossana Podestà as  Carla 
 Philippe Leroy  as Massimo 
 Bruno Scipioni as  Marcello	 
 Odoardo Spadaro as Nonno 
  Tina Lepri as Claudia

References

External links

Italian drama films
1964 drama films
1964 films
Films based on works by Alberto Moravia
Films directed by Marco Vicario
Films with screenplays by Tonino Guerra
Films scored by Riz Ortolani
1960s Italian-language films
1960s Italian films